Ozun Bolagh (also Romanized as Ozūn Bolāgh and Ozoon Bolagh; also known as Owzūn Bolāgh, Owzūq Bolāgh, and Ūzūn Bolāgh) is a village in Varzaq Rural District, in the Central District of Faridan County, Isfahan Province, Iran. At the 2006 census, its population was 1,363, in 359 families.

References 

Populated places in Faridan County